The Royal Security Command is the king of Thailand's military household and is part of Thailand's royal court administration.  It exercises command and control over the military units that are engaged full-time in the protection and guarding of the king and his family as well as the various Royal palaces of Thailand.

The command is responsible for the planning, direction and coordination of the security detachments of the king, queen, heir-apparent and other members of the Thai royal family. It is also responsible for the security of the monarch's representatives and visitors. The security and safety of the king, his family and Royal palaces are the direct responsibility of the Monarch. The units and personnel of the royal security command do not form part of the regular armed forces chain of command.

History

The Royal Security Command was formerly an agency under the Office of the Supreme Commander of the Royal Thai Armed Forces Headquarters. It was established as a King's Guard unit on 18 November 1992. In 2013, the Royal Security Command became a juristic person and was put under the purview of the Ministry of Defense while retaining Crown Prince Vajiralongkorn as its commander.

On 1 May 2017 the Royal Security Command was made a royal agency directly under the command of the monarchy, independent of the rest of the armed forces and the Royal Thai Government.

On 30 September 2019, two infantry regiments were removed from the Royal Thai Army's chain of command and placed under the Royal Security Command. All personnel, assets and operating budgets were likewise transferred to the agency. The move was prompted by the need to provide better security to the royal family, royal residences, and Foreign heads of state and other dignitaries visiting at the monarch's invitation.

Organization

The Royal Security Command is divided into these agencies:
 Office of the Commander (This office is appointed by and directly responsible to the king)
 Office of the Royal Duty Officers
 Office of the Aide-de-Camp
 The King's Close Bodyguard Command (All infantry units from the Royal Thai Army are under this section of the command)
 Office of the Royal Police Guards (This section exercises control over police units assigned to the command)

Military units
The Royal Security Command is in charge of two Infantry regiments: 

 1st Infantry Regiment, King's Close Bodyguard, 'The king's close bodyguards')
1st Infantry Battalion, 1st King's Own Bodyguard Regiment
2nd Infantry Battalion, 1st King's Own Bodyguard Regiment
3rd Infantry Battalion, 1st King's Own Bodyguard Regiment

 11th Infantry Regiment, King's Close Bodyguard,, 'The palace bodyguards')
 1st Infantry Battalion, 11th King's Own Bodyguard Regiment
 2nd Infantry Battalion, 11th King's Own Bodyguard Regiment
 3rd Infantry Battalion, 11th King's Own Bodyguard Regiment

Police units

 Special Service Division Commando (SSD Commando)

See also
 Head of the Royal Thai Armed Forces
 King's Guard (Thailand)
 Praetorianism

References

Royal agencies of Thailand
Protective security units
Thai monarchy
Military units and formations established in 1992
King's Guard units of Thailand